Détente (French for 'relaxation') is the easing of strained relations, especially in a political situation. 

Détente may also refer to:
 La Détente, French short film
 Detente (band), American metal band
 Détente (book), book by former director of Radio Free Europe, George R. Urban
 Detente (album), a 1980 album by the Brecker Brothers

See also 
 Detente bala, an inscription used by Spanish soldiers